Bombarda is a type of weighted float used in rod and reel fishing. The main line is passed through the bombarda. The end of the main line is tied to a swivel, to the other end of the swivel a three to six foot terminal line with hook is tied.  The bombarda when cast, sinks slowly, at the same time, it is reeled in. 

The rate of sinking and reeling-in speed, determines whether the area fished is surface, mid or deep water. Presentation of bait is very natural. It can be used during the day and also night with appropriate baits and in both fresh and seawater. There are various casting weights ranging from 5 to 30 grams. The direction of sinking action can be forward, horizontal or even backward, when tension on the main line is absent.

References

Fishing equipment